Lieutenant-General Leonidas Polk (April 10, 1806 – June 14, 1864) was a bishop of the Episcopal Diocese of Louisiana and founder of the Protestant Episcopal Church in the Confederate States of America, which separated from the Episcopal Church of the United States of America. He was a slaveholding planter in Maury County, Tennessee, and a second cousin of President James K. Polk. He resigned his ecclesiastical position to become a major-general in the Confederate States Army, when he was called "Sewanee's Fighting Bishop". His official portrait at the University of the South depicts him as a bishop with his army uniform hanging nearby. He is often erroneously referred to as "Leonidas K. Polk," but he had no middle name and never signed any documents as such.

Polk was one of the war's more notable, yet controversial, political generals. Recognizing his familiarity with the Mississippi Valley, Confederate president Jefferson Davis commissioned his elevation to a high military position regardless of his lack of prior combat experience. He commanded troops in the Battle of Shiloh, the Battle of Perryville, the Battle of Stones River, the Tullahoma Campaign, the Battle of Chickamauga, the Chattanooga Campaign, and the Atlanta Campaign. He is remembered for his bitter disagreements with his immediate superior, the likewise-controversial General Braxton Bragg of the Army of Tennessee, and for his general lack of success in combat. While serving under the command of General Joseph E. Johnston, he was killed in action in 1864 during the Atlanta Campaign.

Early life and education
Leonidas Polk was born in Raleigh, North Carolina, to Colonel William and Sarah ( Hawkins) Polk. William was a Revolutionary War veteran and prosperous planter. He was of Scottish And Anglo-Huguenot ancestry.

Polk briefly attended the University of North Carolina at Chapel Hill before entering the United States Military Academy at West Point. During his senior year, he left the Scottish Calvinist church and joined the Episcopal Church and was baptized in the Academy Chapel by Chaplain Charles P. McIlvaine, who later became the Episcopal Bishop of Ohio. Polk had an impressive academic record, excelling in rhetoric and moral philosophy. He graduated eighth of 38 cadets on July 1, 1827, and was appointed a brevet second lieutenant in the artillery.

Polk resigned his commission on December 1, 1827, to enter the Virginia Theological Seminary. He became an assistant to Bishop Richard Channing Moore at Monumental Church in Richmond, Virginia. Moore agreed to ordain Polk as a deacon in April 1830; however, on a visit to Raleigh in March, it was discovered that he had never been confirmed as an Episcopalian. To remedy the fact, before his ordination, he was hastily confirmed at St. John's Episcopal Church in Fayetteville, NC. He was then ordained a deacon as planned and a priest the following year. On May 6, 1830, Polk married Frances Ann Devereux, daughter of John Devereux and Frances Pollock; her mother was the granddaughter of Puritan theologian Jonathan Edwards. The Polks had eight children who survived to adulthood.

In 1832, Polk moved his family to the vast Polk Rattle and Snap tract in Maury County, Tennessee, and constructed a massive Greek Revival home called Ashwood Hall. Polk was the largest enslaver in the county in 1840, enslaving 111 people. (By 1850, the census recorded that Polk enslaved 400 people, but other estimates are as high as 1000.) He built a family chapel with his four brothers in Maury County, St. John's Church, at Ashwood. He also served as priest of St. Peter's Church in Columbia, Tennessee. He was appointed Missionary Bishop of the Southwest in September 1838 and was elected first Bishop of Louisiana in October 1841. In 1848, he performed the marriage of his niece, Mary Bayard Devereux, to Major William John Clarke.

Polk was the leading founder of the University of the South in Sewanee, Tennessee, which he envisioned as a national university for the Southern United States and a New World equivalent to Oxford and Cambridge, both in England. (In his August 1856 letter to Bishop Elliott, he expounded on the secessionist motives for his university.) Polk laid and consecrated the cornerstone for the first building on October 9, 1860. Polk's foundational legacy at Sewanee is remembered through his portrait Sword Over the Gown, painted by Eliphalet F. Andrews in 1900. After the original was vandalized in 1998, a copy by Connie Erickson was unveiled on June 1, 2003. The title refers to the answer given by Polk "when asked in Richmond if he was putting off the gown of an Episcopal bishop to take up the sword of a Confederate general, to which he replied, 'No, Sir, I am buckling the sword over the gown,'" indicating that he saw it was his duty as a bishop to take up arms.

American Civil War

Kentucky
At the outbreak of the Civil War, Polk pulled the Louisiana Convention out of the Episcopal Church of the United States to form the Protestant Episcopal Church in the Confederate States of America. Although he hoped that secession would result in a peaceful separation of the slave states from the United States and suggested that he was reluctant to take up arms personally, he did not hesitate to write to his friend and former classmate at West Point, Jefferson Davis, offering his services in the Confederate States Army. Polk was commissioned a major general on June 25, 1861, and ordered to command Department No. 2 (roughly, the area between the Mississippi River and the Tennessee River). He committed one of the great blunders of the Civil War by dispatching troops to occupy Columbus, Kentucky, in September 1861; the governor of the critical border state of Kentucky had declared its neutrality between the United States and the Confederacy. Still, Polk's action prompted the Kentucky legislature to request U.S. aid to "expel the invaders", ensuring U.S. control of Kentucky for the remainder of the war.

During this period, Polk argued about strategy with his subordinate, Brig. Gen. Gideon Johnson Pillow, and his superior, Gen. Albert Sidney Johnston, commander of Confederate forces in the Western Theater. Resentful that his former West Point roommate was giving him orders, he submitted a resignation letter to President Davis on November 6, but Davis rejected the request. Polk's command saw its first combat on November 7, 1861: the minor Battle of Belmont between troops under Pillow and U.S. soldiers under Brig. Gen. Ulysses S. Grant. Polk was wounded nearby on November 11 when the largest cannon in his army, nicknamed "Lady Polk" in honor of his wife, exploded during demonstration firing. The explosion stunned Polk and blew his clothes off, requiring several weeks of recovery.

Army of Mississippi

In April 1862, Polk commanded the First Corps of Albert Sidney Johnston's Army of Mississippi at the Battle of Shiloh. He continued in that role for much of the year under Beauregard, who assumed command following the death of Johnston at Shiloh and then under Gen. Braxton Bragg. At various times his command was considered a corps and, at other times, the "Right Wing" of the army. In the fall, during the invasion of Kentucky by Bragg and Maj. Gen. Edmund Kirby Smith, Polk was in temporary command of the Army of Mississippi while Bragg visited Frankfort to preside over the inauguration of a Confederate governor for the state. Polk disregarded an order from Bragg to attack the flank of the pursuing U.S. army near Frankfort.

At the Battle of Perryville, Polk's right wing constituted the main attacking force against Maj. Gen. Don Carlos Buell's Army of the Ohio, but Polk was reluctant to attack the small portion of Buell's army that faced him until Bragg arrived at the battlefield. One enduring legend of the Civil War is when Polk observed his subordinate, Maj. Gen. Benjamin F. Cheatham, advancing his division, and Cheatham allegedly shouted, "Give 'em hell, boys!" Polk seconded the cheer while retaining the sensibility of a clergyman: "Give it to 'em, boys; give 'em what General Cheatham says!"

Army of Tennessee
After Perryville, Polk began a year-long campaign to get Bragg relieved of command, hoping to use his close relationship with President Davis to accomplish his goal. Despite the failure of his Kentucky campaign, Bragg was retained in command, but this did nothing to reduce the enmity between Polk and Bragg. Polk was promoted to lieutenant general on October 11, 1862, with date of rank of October 10. He became the second most senior Confederate of that rank during the war, behind James Longstreet. In November, the Army of Mississippi was renamed the Army of Tennessee and Polk commanded its First Corps until September 1863.

Polk fought under Bragg at the Battle of Stones River in late 1862. Once again, Bragg's subordinates politicked to remove their army commander after an unsuccessful battle (the battle was tactically inconclusive, but Bragg was unable to stop the advance of the U.S. Army of the Cumberland under Maj. Gen. William S. Rosecrans and Bragg withdrew his army to Tullahoma, Tennessee). Bragg was also unsuccessful in resisting Rosecrans's advance in the Tullahoma Campaign, which began to threaten the important city of Chattanooga. In the face of Rosecrans's expert maneuvering of his army, Polk counseled Bragg to retreat rather than stand and fight in their Tullahoma fortifications.

Rosecrans eventually maneuvered Bragg out of Chattanooga, and the Army of Tennessee withdrew into the mountains of northwestern Georgia with the Army of the Cumberland in hot pursuit. Bragg planned to attack and destroy at least one of Rosecrans's corps, advancing separately over mountainous roads. He was infuriated when Polk's division under Maj. Gen. Thomas C. Hindman failed to attack an isolated U.S. Army corps at Davis's Cross Roads as ordered on September 11. Two days later, Polk disregarded orders from Bragg to attack another isolated corps, the second failed opportunity. At the Battle of Chickamauga, Polk was given command of the Right Wing and the responsibility for initiating the attack on the second day of battle (September 20). He failed to inform his subordinates of the plan, and his wing was late in attacking, allowing the U.S. defenders time to complete their field fortifications. Bragg wrote after the war that if it were not for the loss of these hours, "our independence might have been won."

Chickamauga was a great tactical victory for Bragg. Still, instead of pursuing and destroying the U.S. army as it retreated, he laid siege to it in Chattanooga, concentrating his effort against the enemies inside his army instead of his enemies from the North. Bragg demanded an explanation from Polk on his failure to attack in time on September 20, and Polk placed the blame entirely on one of his subordinates, Maj. Gen. D. H. Hill. Bragg wrote to President Davis, "Gen'l Polk by education and habit is unfit for executing the plans of others. He will convince himself his own are better and follow them without reflecting on the consequences." Bragg relieved Polk of his command and ordered him to Atlanta to await further orders. Although Polk protested the "arbitrary and unlawful order" to the Secretary of War and demanded a court of inquiry, he was not restored to his position. Davis once again retained Bragg in army command, despite the protestations of several of his subordinate generals.

Mississippi
President Davis transferred his friend Polk to command the Department of Mississippi and East Louisiana (December 23, 1863 – January 28, 1864) and then the Department of Alabama and East Mississippi (January 28 – May 4, 1864), giving him effective command of the state of Mississippi following the departure of Gen. Joseph E. Johnston to replace Bragg in command of the Army of Tennessee. Polk unsuccessfully attempted to oppose Maj. Gen. William Tecumseh Sherman's raid against Meridian, Mississippi, in February 1864. In May, he was ordered to take his forces and join Johnston in resisting Sherman's advance in the Atlanta Campaign. He assumed command of the Third Corps of the Army of Tennessee on May 4. His command remained commonly known as the "Army of Mississippi".

Atlanta Campaign and death
Polk brought more than 20,000 men with him to Georgia. Because of his elevated rank, he became the army's second in command under Johnston. By using successive flanking maneuvers, Sherman forced Johnston to withdraw his army from strong defensive positions to protect the Confederate line of communication. This forced Johnston ever closer to the critically important city of Atlanta.

On June 14, 1864, Polk was scouting enemy positions near Marietta, Georgia, with his staff when he was killed in action by a U.S.  shell at Pine Mountain. The artillery fire was initiated when Sherman spotted a cluster of Confederate generals — Polk, William J. Hardee, and Johnston, with their staffs — in an exposed area. He pointed them out to Maj. Gen. Oliver Otis Howard, commander of the U.S. IV Corps, and ordered him to fire upon them. Battery I of the 1st Ohio Light Artillery, commanded by Capt. Hubert Dilger, obeyed the order within minutes. The first round from the battery came close and a second came even closer, causing the men to disperse. The third shell struck Polk's left arm, went through his chest, and exited, hitting his right arm, then exploded against a tree; it nearly cut Polk in two.

Legacy

Although his record as a field commander was poor, Polk was immensely popular with his troops, and his death was deeply mourned in the Army of Tennessee. Polk's funeral service at Saint Paul's Church in Augusta, Georgia, was one of the most elaborate during the war. His friend Bishop Stephen Elliott of Georgia presided at the service, delivering a stirring funeral oration. He was buried in a location under the present-day altar. The church has a monument to Polk near the altar, and the original grave site can be visited. In 1945, his remains and those of his wife were reinterred at Christ Church Cathedral in New Orleans. His grave can be found in the front floor sanctuary, to the right of the pulpit. Fort Polk in Louisiana is named in Polk's memory.

Polk's nephew, Lucius E. Polk, was also a Confederate general. Lucius E. Polk's son Rufus King Polk was a Congressman. Polk's son, William Mecklenburg Polk, was a physician and a Confederate captain who later served as a First Lieutenant in the U.S. Army during World War I. He later authored his most flattering biography. William M. Polk's son, Frank Polk, served as a counselor to the U.S. Department of State through World War I and later became the first Under Secretary of State. A brother of Polk, Lucius Junius Polk, married a grand-niece of Rachel Jackson, wife of U.S. President Andrew Jackson. U.S. President James K. Polk was Polk's first cousin twice removed.

Polk's portrait, done by Cornelius Hankins, was donated to Christ Church Cathedral in Nashville, Tennessee, by his grandson W. Dudley Gate, in 1963.

Military historian Steven E. Woodworth described the shell that killed Polk as "one of the worst shots fired for the Union cause during the entire course of the war", as Polk's incompetence made him far more valuable alive than dead: "Polk's incompetence and willful disobedience had consistently hamstrung Confederate operations west of the Appalachians, while his special relationship with the president made the bishop-general untouchable."

See also 
 List of Confederate States Army generals
 List of people from Raleigh, North Carolina

Notes

References
 Connelly, Thomas L. Autumn of Glory: The Army of Tennessee 1862–1865. Baton Rouge: Louisiana State University Press, 1971. .
 Dupuy, Trevor N., Curt Johnson, and David L. Bongard. The Harper Encyclopedia of Military Biography. New York: HarperCollins, 1992. .
 Eicher, John H., and David J. Eicher. Civil War High Commands. Stanford, CA: Stanford University Press, 2001. .
 Foote, Shelby. The Civil War: A Narrative. Vol. 3, Red River to Appomattox. New York: Random House, 1974. .
 Hallock, Judith Lee. Braxton Bragg and Confederate Defeat. Vol. 2. Tuscaloosa: University of Alabama Press, 1991. .
 McDonough, James Lee. Chattanooga—A Death Grip on the Confederacy. Knoxville: University of Tennessee Press, 1984. .
 McMurry, Richard M. Atlanta 1864: Last Chance for the Confederacy. Lincoln: University of Nebraska Press, 2000. .
 McWhiney, Grady. Braxton Bragg and Confederate Defeat. Vol. 1. New York: Columbia University Press, 1969 (additional material, Tuscaloosa: University of Alabama Press, 1991). .
 Noe, Kenneth W. Perryville: This Grand Havoc of Battle. Lexington: University Press of Kentucky, 2001. .
 Parks, Joseph H. General Leonidas Polk, C.S.A.: The Fighting Bishop (Southern Biography Series). Baton Rouge: Louisiana State University Press, 1992. .
 Robins, Glenn. "Leonidas Polk." In Encyclopedia of the American Civil War: A Political, Social, and Military History, edited by David S. Heidler and Jeanne T. Heidler. New York: W. W. Norton & Company, 2000. .
 Robins, Glenn. The Bishop of the Old South: The Ministry And Civil War Legacy of Leonidas Polk. Mercer Univ Pr, 2006.  
 Sifakis, Stewart. Who Was Who in the Civil War. New York: Facts On File, 1988. .
 Smith, Derek. The Gallant Dead: Union & Confederate Generals Killed in the Civil War. Mechanicsburg, PA: Stackpole Books, 2005. .
 Warner, Ezra J. Generals in Gray: Lives of the Confederate Commanders. Baton Rouge: Louisiana State University Press, 1959. .
 Watkins, Sam. Co. Aytch Maury Grays, First Tennessee Regiment or, A Side Show of the Big Show. Cumberland Presbyterian Publishing House, 1882. .
 Welsh, Jack D. Medical Histories of Confederate Generals. Kent, OH: Kent State University Press, 1999. .
Woodworth, Steven E. Jefferson Davis and His Generals: The Failure of Confederate Command in the West. Lawrence: University Press of Kansas, 1990. .
Woodworth, Steven E. Six Armies in Tennessee: The Chickamauga and Chattanooga Campaigns. Lincoln: University of Nebraska Press, 1998. .

External links

 Leonidas Polk Memorial Society, retrieved December 12, 2017.
 Bush, Bryan S. "Confederate General Leonidas Polk and the collapse of the Confederate command structure in the Western Theater". NU XI Student Historical Journal, Phi Alpha Theta History Honor Society, University of Louisville chapter, Fall 2004.
The Leonidas Polk Registry Research Project
Biography at Encyclopedia of Arkansas History and Culture
Biography at Louisiana Historical Association's Dictionary of Louisiana Biography (Scroll down.)
Biography at Know Southern History
Biography at About North Georgia
CivilWarAlbum.com — Historical marker, monument, and article
DeMar, Gary, Article on University of the South and Bishop Polk
The Funeral Services for Bishop Polk, led by the Right Reverend Stephen Elliott
A detailed description of the burial service, with photos of the original burial site.

Leonidas Polk Family Papers at The Historic New Orleans Collection 
Leonidas Polk family papers (MS 468). Manuscripts and Archives, Yale University Library. 

1806 births
1864 deaths
Leonidas
 
American planters
American people of Scottish descent
American people of Scotch-Irish descent
Confederate States of America military personnel killed in the American Civil War
Confederate States Army lieutenant generals
People from Maury County, Tennessee
People of Kentucky in the American Civil War
People of North Carolina in the American Civil War
People of Tennessee in the American Civil War
Sewanee: The University of the South people
United States Military Academy alumni
19th-century Anglican bishops in the United States
Virginia Theological Seminary alumni
Bishops in Louisiana
19th-century American politicians
American slave owners
University of North Carolina at Chapel Hill alumni
Episcopal bishops of Louisiana
Episcopal bishops of Arkansas
Pro-Confederate clergy